The Wales Centre for Health was a statutory organisation established on 1 April 2005, under the Health (Wales) Act 2003, as a Welsh Assembly Sponsored Public Body. It had a broad remit for working with other organisations to help improve health in Wales. It was abolished on 1 October 2009 following the passing of The Wales Centre for Health (Transfer of Functions, Property, Rights and Liabilities and Abolition) (Wales) Order 2009.

External links
 Official site

References

Medical and health organisations based in Wales
Senedd
Welsh executive agencies
Government agencies established in 2005
Organisations based in Cardiff
2005 establishments in Wales